West Branch Township is a civil township of Marquette County in the U.S. state of Michigan. The population was 1,702 at the 2020 census.

Geography

Demographics
As of the census of 2000, there were 1,648 people, 596 households, and 448 families residing in the township. There were 889 housing units at an average density of 25.1 per square mile (9.7/km). The racial makeup of the township was 91.63% White, 0.30% African American, 2.97% Native American, 0.49% Asian, 1.46% from other races, and 3.16% from two or more races. Hispanic or Latino of any race were 1.76% of the population.

There were 596 households, out of which 45.5% had children under the age of 18 living with them, 57.6% were married couples living together, 13.1% had a female householder with no husband present, and 24.8% were non-families. 17.1% of all households were made up of individuals, and 3.4% had someone living alone who was 65 years of age or older.  The average household size was 2.77 and the average family size was 3.13.

In the township the population was spread out, with 33.6% under the age of 18, 9.0% from 18 to 24, 32.7% from 25 to 44, 19.5% from 45 to 64, and 5.2% who were 65 years of age or older.  The median age was 30 years. For every 100 females, there were 94.1 males.  For every 100 females age 18 and over, there were 94.0 males.

The median income for a household in the township was $30,183, and the median income for a family was $31,797. Males had a median income of $31,917 versus $30,446 for females. The per capita income for the township was $14,685.  About 14.0% of families and 17.1% of the population were below the poverty line, including 20.9% of those under age 18 and 9.8% of those age 65 or over.

References

Townships in Marquette County, Michigan
Townships in Michigan